Kusyevo is a rural locality (a village) in Staroselskoye Rural Settlement, Vologodsky District, Vologda Oblast, Russia. The population was 16 as of 2002.

Geography 
Kusyevo is located 68 km west of Vologda (the district's administrative centre) by road. Koskovo is the nearest rural locality.

References 

Rural localities in Vologodsky District